Dirinaria is a genus of lichenized fungi in the family Caliciaceae. The genus has a widespread distribution, especially in tropical regions, and contains about 35 species.

Species
Dirinaria aegialita  (1968)
Dirinaria applanata  (1970)
Dirinaria aspera  (1964)
Dirinaria batavica  (1975)
Dirinaria complicata  (1975)
Dirinaria confluens  (1975)
Dirinaria consimilis  (1970)
Dirinaria flava  (1971)
Dirinaria flavida  (2019)
Dirinaria frostii  (1970)
Dirinaria melanoclina  (1975)
Dirinaria minuta  (2001)
Dirinaria neotropica  (2004)
Dirinaria picta  (1931)
Dirinaria pruinosa  (2001)
Dirinaria purpurascens  (1968)
Dirinaria sekikaica  (2008)
Dirinaria subconfluens  (1975)

References

Caliciales
Lichen genera
Caliciales genera
Taxa described in 1877
Taxa named by Edward Tuckerman